Chris Woodruff was the defending champion, but lost in second round to Mardy Fish.

Peter Wessels won the title by defeating Jens Knippschild 7–6(7–3), 6–3 in the final.

Seeds

Draw

Final

Top half

Bottom half

References
 Official Results Archive (ATP)
 Official Results Archive (ITF)

2000 Hall of Fame Tennis Championships